Povrateno (Macedonian: Повратено; English: Returned back) is a traditional Macedonian Oro, folk dance, from the region of Skopje.

It is a women's dance with medium fast movements on a whole feet. The dancers are holding their belts with left hand over the right one and begin their dance in a position of a half circle. The dance rhythm is 2/4.

See also
Music of North Macedonia

Further reading
Dimovski, Mihailo. (1977:66-9). Macedonian folk dances (Original in Macedonian: Македонски народни ора). Skopje: Naša kniga & Institut za folklor

Macedonian dances